The 1941 NCAA basketball tournament involved eight schools playing in single-elimination play to determine the national champion of men's NCAA college basketball. It began on March 21, 1941, and ended with the championship game on March 29 in Kansas City, Missouri. A total of nine games were played, including a third place game in both regions.

Wisconsin, coached by Bud Foster, won the national title with a 39–34 victory in the final over Washington State, coached by Jack Friel. John Kotz of Wisconsin was named the tournament's Most Outstanding Player.

Locations
The following are the sites selected to host each round of the 1941 tournament:

Regionals

March 21 and 22
East Regional, Wisconsin Field House, Madison, Wisconsin
West Regional, Municipal Auditorium, Kansas City, Missouri

Championship Game

March 29
Municipal Auditorium, Kansas City, Missouri

For the second straight year, the Municipal Auditorium hosted both the West Regional games and the Championship game, making it the first arena to repeat as host. The East Regional was held on a different college campus for the third straight year, this time at the University of Wisconsin in Madison. This marked the first of two times the Wisconsin Field House hosted games, and first of three times the University has, hosting at its replacement, the Kohl Center, in 2002.

Teams

Bracket

Regional third place

See also
 1941 National Invitation Tournament
 1941 NAIA Basketball Tournament

References

Ncaa
NCAA Division I men's basketball tournament